The bar-tailed godwit (Limosa lapponica) is a large and strongly migratory wader in the family Scolopacidae, which feeds on bristle-worms and shellfish on coastal mudflats and estuaries. It has distinctive red breeding plumage, long legs, and a long upturned bill. Bar-tailed godwits breed on Arctic coasts and tundra from Scandinavia to Alaska, and overwinter on coasts in temperate and tropical regions of Australia and New Zealand. The migration of the subspecies Limosa lapponica baueri across the Pacific Ocean from Alaska to New Zealand is the longest known non-stop flight of any bird, and also the longest journey without pausing to feed by any animal.

Taxonomy
The bar-tailed godwit was formally described by the Swedish naturalist Carl Linnaeus in 1758 in the tenth edition of his Systema Naturae under the binomial name Scolopax limosa. It is now placed with three other godwits in the genus Limosa that was introduced by the French zoologist Mathurin Jacques Brisson in 1760. The genus name Limosa is from Latin and means "muddy", from limus, "mud", referring to its preferred habitat. The specific name lapponica refers to Lapland.

The English term "godwit" was first recorded in about 1416–17 and may be an imitation of the bird's call, or be derived from the Old English "god whit", meaning "good creature", perhaps referring to its eating qualities. Its English name is taken from the black-and-white barred tail and upper tail coverts in this species. In French it is known as barge rousse, Russian maliy veretennik, Inuit chiuchiuchiak, Yup'ik tevatevaaq, and Māori kūaka.

Four subspecies are recognised:
L. l. lapponica (Linnaeus, 1758) – breeds from northern Scandinavia east to the Yamal Peninsula; winters western coasts of Europe and Africa from the British Isles and the Netherlands south to South Africa, and also around the Persian Gulf.
L. l. taymyrensis Engelmoer & Roselaar, 1998 – breeds in central Siberia from the Yamal Peninsula east to the Anabar River delta; winters in southwest Asia and coasts of Africa to South Africa
L. l. menzbieri – Portenko, 1936 – breeds northeastern Asia from the Anabar River east to the Kolyma River delta; winters in southeast Asia and northwest Australia
L. l. baueri – Naumann, 1836 – breeds in northeast Siberia to north and west Alaska; winters in China and Australasia. Largest subspecies. (includes anadyrensis)

Description

The bar-tailed godwit is a relatively short-legged species of godwit. Males average smaller than females but with much overlap; males weigh , while females weigh ; there is also some regional variation in size (see subspecies, below). The adult has blue-grey legs and a long, tapering, slightly upturned bi-colored bill: pink at the base and black towards the tip. The neck, breast and belly are unbroken brick red in breeding plumage, and dark brown above. Females breeding plumage is much duller than males, with a chestnut to cinnamon belly. Breeding plumage is not fully apparent until the third year, and there are three distinguishable age classes; during their first migration north immature males are noticeably paler in colour than more mature males. Non-breeding birds seen in the Southern Hemisphere are plain grey-brown with darker feather centres, giving them a striped look, and are whitish underneath. Juveniles are similar to non-breeding adults but more buff overall with streaked plumages on flanks and breast.

Alaska-breeding bar-tailed godwits show an increase in body size from north to south, but this trend is not apparent in their non-breeding grounds in New Zealand; birds of different sizes mix freely.

Limosa lapponica is distinguished from the black-tailed godwit (Limosa limosa) by its black-and-white horizontally-barred (rather than wholly black) tail, and lack of white wing bars. The most similar species is the Asiatic dowitcher (Limnodromus semipalmatus).

Distribution and migration

All bar-tailed godwits spend the Northern Hemisphere summer in the Arctic, where they breed, and make a long-distance migration south in winter to more temperate areas. L. l. lapponica make the shortest migration, some only as far as the North Sea, while others travel as far as India. Bar-tailed godwits nesting in Alaska (L. l. baueri) travel all the way to Australia and New Zealand. They undertake the longest non-stop migrations of any bird, and to fuel they carry the greatest fat loads of any migratory bird so far studied, reducing the size of their digestive organs to do so.

L. l. bauri breeds in Alaska and spends the non-breeding season in eastern Australia and New Zealand. L. l. menzbieri breeds in Siberia and migrates to northern and western Australia. At least three other bar-tailed godwits also appear to have reached the Yellow Sea after non-stop flights from New Zealand.

One specific female of the flock, nicknamed "E7", flew onward from China to Alaska and stayed there for the breeding season. In 2021, a male bar-tailed godwit, 4BBRW, set a new record for non-stop migratory flight with an 8,100 mile (approximately 13035km) flight from Alaska, USA to New South Wales, Australia. The same individual held a previous record in 2020. In 2022, a godwit numbered 234684 left Alaska on 13 October and flew non-stop to Tasmania, the first time a tagged bird has flown this route.

Both Australasian subspecies head north to their breeding grounds along the coast of Asia to the Yalu Jiang coastal wetland in the north Yellow Sea, the most important staging grounds for godwits and great knots (Calidris tenuirostris) in their northern migration. Menzbieri spent on average 38 days in the Yellow Sea region and flew an additional  to high Arctic Russia.

Birds will often depart early from New Zealand if there are favourable winds; they seem to be able to predict weather patterns that will assist them on the entire migration route. Birds that had nested in southern Alaska were larger and departed New Zealand earliest; this pattern was repeated six months later, with birds departing Alaska in the same order they arrived, and over the same span of days. Birds in southern New Zealand departed on average 9–11 days earlier than birds in more northern sites. Godwits arrive at the Yukon-Kuskokwim Delta in Alaska in two waves; local breeders in early May, and larger flocks in the third week of May en route to breeding grounds further north.

Behaviour and ecology

Breeding
The bar-tailed godwit is a non-breeding migrant in Australia and New Zealand. Birds first depart for their northern hemisphere breeding sites at age 2–4. Breeding take place each year in Scandinavia, northern Asia, and Alaska. The nest is a shallow cup in moss sometimes lined with vegetation. Clutch size is from 2 to 5, averaging four. Both sexes share incubation of the eggs for 20 to 21 days, the female during the day and the male at night.

Food and feeding

The birds' main source of food in wetlands is bristle-worms (up to 70%), supplemented by small bivalves and crustaceans. In wet pastures, bar-tailed godwits eat invertebrates. In a major staging site in the northern Yellow Sea, they continue to hunt polychaetes, but most of their food intake is the bivalve mollusc Potamocorbula laevis, which they generally swallow whole.

Male bar-tailed godwits are smaller than females and have shorter bills. In a study at the Manawatū Estuary, shorter-billed birds (males) fed mostly on small surface prey like Potamopyrgus snails, half being snail specialists, whereas females consumed more deeply-buried prey such as worms; the birds also displayed some individual food preferences.

Status
The status of the bar-tailed godwit is Near Threatened, and the population is declining. Fewer birds have been using East African estuaries since 1979, and there has been a steady decline in numbers around the Kola Peninsula, Siberia, since 1930. The global population is estimated to number 1,099,000–1,149,000 individuals.

Both L. l. bauri  and L. l. menzbieri adult survival rates decreased between 2005 and 2012, probably because of the loss of intertidal staging areas in the Yellow Sea. The construction of seawalls and the reclamation of mudflats have led to a critical reduction in food supplies for migrating birds, particularly subspecies like L. l. menzbieri that rely on the Yalu Jiang estuary on both their northward and southward migrations. Numbers of L. l. baueri have declined in New Zealand from over 100,000 in the late 1980s to 67,500 in 2018.

The bar-tailed godwit is one of the species to which the Agreement on the Conservation of African-Eurasian Migratory Waterbirds (AEWA) applies. In New Zealand the species is protected under the 1953 Wildlife Act.

Gallery

References

Identification

External links

 Bar-tailed godwit species text in The Atlas of Southern African Birds
 
 
 
 
 
 
 
 
The kūaka discussed on RNZ Critter of the Week, 21 Feb 2020

bar-tailed godwit
bar-tailed godwit
Native birds of Alaska
Birds of Russia
Birds of Scandinavia
Birds of Africa
Birds of New Zealand
Birds of Australia
bar-tailed godwit
bar-tailed godwit
Articles containing video clips
Holarctic birds